The Congolese Association Football Federation (FECOFA) is the governing body of football in the Democratic Republic of the Congo. It was founded in 1919 and affiliated to the FIFA in 1964 and CAF in 1964. It organizes the national football league Linafoot and the national team.

The organisation was previously named the Zairian Association Football Federation (FEZAFA) while the country was known as Zaire.

In September 2021, the General Inspectorate of Finance claims to have foiled an attempt to embezzle public funds. Fécofa, the Congolese Football Association, was forced to return nearly a million US dollars acquired fraudulently. This sum was initially allocated to the organization of a sporting event.

References

External links
 
 DR Congo at the FIFA website.
 DR Congo at the CAF website

Congo DR
Football in the Democratic Republic of the Congo
Sports organizations established in 1919
Football